The 1925 Canton Bulldogs season was their fifth in the National Football League and their first season since 1923. The team failed to improve on their previous record against NFL opponents of 11–0–1, winning only four NFL games. They finished eleventh in the league.

Schedule

 Games in italics are against non-NFL teams.

Standings

References

Canton Bulldogs seasons
Canton Bulldogs
Toronto, Ohio
Steubenville, Ohio
Canton Bulldogs